During the 1988–89 season, the Louisville Cardinals men's basketball team scored 24 wins and 8 losses. They played in the Metro Conference and finished in the "Sweet Sixteen" of the NCAA Division I men's basketball tournament. Their player Pervis Ellison won several individual awards.

Roster

Schedule and results

|-
!colspan=12 style=| Regular season

|-
!colspan=12 style=| Metro Conference tournament

|-
!colspan=12 style=| NCAA Tournament

Rankings

Awards and honors
 Pervis Ellison : Metro Conference tournament Most Outstanding Player

Individual All-America teams 
 Pervis Ellison : 1989 Consensus All-America first team
 Pervis Ellison : First team All-American by NABC and USBWA
 Pervis Ellison : Second team All-American by Associated Press and UPI

Team players drafted into the NBA

See also
1989 NCAA Division I men's basketball tournament

References

Louisville Cardinals men's basketball seasons
Louisville Cardinals
Louisville
Louisville Cardinals men's basketball, 1988-89
Louisville Cardinals men's basketball, 1988-89